SS Gro was a small freighter built in Scotland during the 1890s. Completed in 1895, she was sold to A Swedish company in 1903 and then to a Norwegian company in 1916. During the First World War the ship was sunk by the German submarine SM UC-47 in August 1917.

Description 
She had a vertical triple-expansion steam engine driving a single screw propeller. The engine was rated at 241 nominal horsepower.

Construction and career 
Gro was laid down as yard number 118 by William Hamilton and Company at its shipyard in Port Glasgow, Scotland, for E. F. and W. Roberts. The ship was launched on 30 January 1895 as Alagonia and completed on 16 March. She was sold to John Herron and Co. of Liverpool on 6 December 1898 and was transferred to the Lord Curzon Steam Ship Co. on 3 January 1899. The ship was to have been renamed Lord Curzon, but she was sold to the Palatine Shipping Co. of Manchester, England, on 16 November before this was done.

Alagonia was sold on 16 March 1903 to Rederi A/B Union of Stockholm, Sweden, and renamed Ros. The ship was sold to D/S A/S Avenir of Christiania, Norway, and renamed Gro in 1916. She was

References

Bibliography

Ships built on the River Clyde
Steamships of the United Kingdom
Maritime incidents in 1917
World War I merchant ships of Norway
1895 ships
Steamships of Norway